is the northern terminal railway station on the JR East Tsugaru Line located in the town of Sotogahama, Aomori Prefecture, Japan.

Lines

Station layout
Minmaya Station has one island platform connected to the station building by a level crossing; however, one side of the platform is not in use.

Platforms

History
Minmaya Station was opened on October 21, 1958 as Miumaya Station on the Japanese National Railways (JNR). With the privatization of the JNR on April 1, 1987, it came under the operational control of JR East. It officially adopted the present pronunciation of its name on March 16, 1991. The station became unmanned on June 1, 2019.

Surrounding area

former Minmaya Village Hall

Passenger statistics
In fiscal 2018, the station was used by an average of 25 passengers daily.

See also
List of railway stations in Japan

References

External links

 

Stations of East Japan Railway Company
Railway stations in Japan opened in 1958
Railway stations in Aomori Prefecture
Tsugaru Line
Sotogahama, Aomori